Presidential elections were held in Peru in May 1908. Augusto B. Leguía of the Civilista Party was elected unopposed.

Results

References

Presidential elections in Peru
Peru
1908 in Peru
Single-candidate elections
Election and referendum articles with incomplete results